The Sorcerer is a live album by Hungarian jazz guitarist Gábor Szabó featuring performances recorded in 1967 for the Impulse! label.

Reception
The Allmusic review by Douglas Payne awarded the album 4½ stars stating "The playing seems inspired, and the interplay within the group is something to behold -- even when performing lightweight tunes".

Track listing
All compositions by Gábor Szabó except as indicated
 "The Beat Goes On" (Sonny Bono) - 4:52
 "Little Boat (O Barquinho)" (Ronaldo Bôscoli, Roberto Menescal) - 4:23
 "Lou-Ise" (Jimmy Stewart) - 4:17
 "What Is This Thing Called Love?" (Cole Porter) - 5:18
 "Space" - 6:40
 "Stronger Than Us" (Francis Lai, Pierre Barough) - 4:13
 "Mizrab" - 6:58
 "Comin' Back" (Clyde Otis, Gábor Szabó) 1:56
 "Los Matadoros" - 12:09 (Bonus track on CD reissue)
 "People" (Jule Styne, Bob Merrill) - 5:18 (Bonus track on CD reissue)
 "Corcovado" (Antônio Carlos Jobim) - 3:22 (Bonus track on CD reissue)
Recorded at The Jazz Workshop in Boston, Massachusetts on April 14 & 15, 1967

Personnel
Gábor Szabó - guitar
Jimmy Stewart - guitar
Lajos "Louis" Kabok - bass
Marty Morell – drums
Hal Gordon - percussion

References

Impulse! Records live albums
Gábor Szabó albums
1967 live albums
Albums produced by Bob Thiele